Reftele is a locality situated in Gislaved Municipality, Jönköping County, Sweden with 1,282 inhabitants in 2010. Here lived Johan Svensson who died in the sinking of Titanic at age of 75 and his son Amandus Ekström at age of 45.

References 

Populated places in Jönköping County
Populated places in Gislaved Municipality
Finnveden